Gandhigram, locally known as Shidi, is a village inhabited by Lisu people in Vijoynagar circle, Changlang district, Arunachal Pradesh, India. The population was 1,754 at the 2011 Indian census. There is no road connectivity to the nearest town, Miao, and it is a five- or six-day walk.

Education 
The village has a government middle school established in 1961 and the newly-established Katha Lisu School, with class I and preceding Nursery and KG classes and an enrollment of about 200 students.

References

Villages in Changlang district